Hong Kong participated in the 2010 Asian Para Games–First Asian Para Games in Guangzhou, China from 13 to 19 December 2010. Athletes from Hong Kong won total 28 medals (including five gold), and finished at the ninth spot in a medal table.

References

Nations at the 2010 Asian Para Games
2010 in Hong Kong sport
Hong Kong at the Asian Para Games